Vladimir Jocić (born 29 November 1953) is a Serbian football manager and former player.

Playing career
After spending two and a half seasons with Radnički Niš in the Yugoslav First League, Jocić joined Partizan in 1979. He failed to make much impact and was transferred to Napredak Kruševac during the 1980–81 season. After playing for three clubs in the Yugoslav Second League for five seasons, Jocić moved abroad and signed with Turkish club Kocaelispor in 1986.

Managerial career
After hanging up his boots, Jocić served as manager of numerous clubs, including Napredak Kruševac, Radnički Pirot (April–June 2006), Radnički Niš (two spells), Šumadija Radnički 1923, Radnički Šid, Radnički Sremska Mitrovica, and Hajduk Divoš (February–April 2018).

Career statistics

References

External links
 
 
 

Association football forwards
Expatriate footballers in Turkey
FK Kolubara players
FK Napredak Kruševac managers
FK Napredak Kruševac players
FK Partizan players
FK Radnički Niš managers
FK Radnički Niš players
FK Radnički Pirot managers
FK Radnički 1923 managers
FK Sutjeska Nikšić players
Kocaelispor footballers
People from Prokuplje
Red Star Belgrade footballers
Serbian football managers
Serbian footballers
Süper Lig players
Yugoslav expatriate footballers
Yugoslav expatriate sportspeople in Turkey
Yugoslav First League players
Yugoslav footballers
Yugoslav Second League players
1953 births
Living people